The D'Urville River is in the South Island of New Zealand.

It is one of the smaller rivers in the Buller River system. The river was named after the French navigator Jules Dumont d'Urville by Julius von Haast.

Brown and rainbow trout can be fished in the D'Urville River.

A tramping track runs along the river.

References

Rivers of the Tasman District
Rivers of New Zealand